William Joseph Charles Lacken (July 3, 1888 – September 26, 1916) was a Canadian amateur ice hockey player who played for the Montreal Wanderers in the Eastern Canada Amateur Hockey Association (ECAHL).

Early life and hockey career
Lacken was born on July 3, 1888 in Montreal to William and Mary Seale Lacken. He first played for Montreal CPR of the Montreal Manufacturers Hockey League, before joining the Montreal Wanderers in season 1908–09 and appearing twice. After playing for the Montreal Stars in 1910, Lacken moved to the United States to play for the New York Athletic Club, but was signed to the New York Wanderers. He appeared 8 times and scored 10 goals.

Military career and death
Lacken worked as a clerk and served in the 17th Duke of York's Hussars for 3 years. To serve in World War I, he re-enlisted in the Canadian Expeditionary Force on August 27, 1914 and was assigned to the 15th Battalion. In August 1916, Lacken was promoted to lance corporal; however, his rank was reverted to private upon his request. He was killed on the Western Front at Regina Trench, Courcelette on September 26, 1916 and is commemorated at the Vimy Memorial.

Career statistics

References

1888 births
1916 deaths
Canadian ice hockey centres
Military personnel from Montreal
Montreal Wanderers players
Canadian Expeditionary Force soldiers
Canadian military personnel killed in World War I
Ice hockey people from Montreal
Canadian military personnel of World War I